Peter Anthony Larkin,  (1924–1996) was a fisheries scientist who spent most of his career at the University of British Columbia. After his PhD at the Exeter College, Oxford, he moved to Canada as the Chief Fisheries Biologist of British Columbia, in a joint appointment between the provincial government and the University of British Columbia (UBC). At UBC, he later served as the Head of the Department of Zoology (1972–1975), as the Dean of Graduate Studies (1975–1984), and as the Vice President Research (1986–1988). He authored some 160 scientific papers. He was also an admired teacher who won UBC's Master Teacher Award in 1971. Outside UBC, he served as the Director of the Pacific Biological Station at Nanaimo (1963–1966).

Honours
Larkin was made a Fellow of the Royal Society of Canada in 1965. He was awarded the Queen Elizabeth II Silver Jubilee Medal in 1977, the Fry Medal of the Canadian Society of Zoologists in 1978, and the American Fisheries Society Award of Excellence in 1984. He also received the Order of Canada in 1995, and became a Member of the Order of British Columbia in June 1996.

Legacy
"Larkin Lectures" are an approximately biannual series of lectures at the Institute for the Oceans and Fisheries, University of British Columbia. The series was initiated upon Larkin's retirement. The first lecture was given by Ray Beverton in 1995.

By early 2018, Google Scholar listed more than 900 citations to Larkin's "An epitaph for the concept of maximum sustained yield", an essay based on his keynote lecture at the American Fisheries Society Annual Meeting in 1976.

References

1924 births
1996 deaths
Scientists from Auckland
Fellows of the Royal Society of Canada
Members of the Order of Canada
Members of the Order of British Columbia
Alumni of Exeter College, Oxford
Academic staff of the University of British Columbia
University of Saskatchewan alumni
Scientists from British Columbia
Canadian ichthyologists
20th-century New Zealand zoologists
New Zealand ichthyologists
20th-century Canadian zoologists